"Do You Want to Dance" is a song written by American singer Bobby Freeman and recorded by him in 1958. It reached number No. 5 on the United States Billboard Top 100 Sides pop chart and No. 2 on the Billboard R&B chart. Cliff Richard and the Shadows' version of the song reached No. 2 in the United Kingdom in 1962, despite being a B-side. The Beach Boys' version reached No. 12 as "Do You Wanna Dance?" in the United States in 1965, and a 1972 cover by Bette Midler ("Do You Want to Dance?") reached No. 17.

A different song called "Do You Wanna Dance?" was a UK hit for Barry Blue in 1973.

Bobby Freeman version
San Francisco-born teenager Bobby Freeman had been a member of doo-wop groups the Romancers and the Vocaleers.  When asked by a local DJ if he had written any songs, he wrote several and recorded them as solo demos.  These included "Do You Want to Dance", which was heard by a visiting record label executive, Mortimer Palitz of Jubilee Records.  He signed Freeman to the label, and had the original recording overdubbed in New York by session musicians including guitarist Billy Mure.  Released on the Jubilee subsidiary label Josie, "Do You Want to Dance" quickly rose to number 5 on the pop chart and number 2 on the R&B chart in early 1958, when Freeman was still only 17.  Contrary to some reports, Jerry Garcia did not play on the record.

The song was included in Robert Christgau's "Basic Record Library" of 1950s and 1960s recordings, published in Christgau's Record Guide: Rock Albums of the Seventies (1981).

Cliff Richard and the Shadows version

The Cliff Richard and the Shadows version also known as "Do You Wanna Dance" was released in the United Kingdom as the B-side of "I'm Lookin' Out the Window" in May 1962. However, like seven other Cliff Richard singles released between 1959 and 1963, the B-side received a good amount of airplay and made the New Musical Express UK singles chart in its own right. On this occasion, it became Richard's second highest charting B-side (after "Bachelor Boy"), making it to number 10 (while "I'm Lookin' Out the Window" reached number 2). The single reached number 2 on the other UK chart, the official UK Singles Chart, listing both tracks.

"Do You Want to Dance" went on to become the more successful charting track from the single in some countries, reaching number 1 in the Netherlands, Australia (based on the Sydney chart of the time, because an Australian nationwide chart had not yet started) and Flemish Belgium. The single went on to sell over 1 million copies worldwide.

"Do You Want to Dance" was included on the EP Cliff’s Hits, released November 1962, and first appeared on LP with Richard's first compilation album Cliff's Hit Album, released July 1963. A live version appeared on Richard's double album Japan Tour 74 issued in 1975.

Recording
"Do You Want to Dance" was recorded on December 19, 1961 at EMI's Abbey Road Studios. The session, engineered by Malcolm Addy and produced by EMI's A&R man Norrie Paramor, featured new drummer Brian Bennett and Jet Harris on bass, soon to leave the Shadows in 1962.

Charts
Chart entries as "Do You Want to Dance" or "Do You Want to Dance"/"I'm Looking Out the Window":

Chart entries as "I'm Looking Out the Window"/"Do You Want to Dance":

The Beach Boys version

The Beach Boys' version of "Do You Wanna Dance?" was a single released through Capitol Records on February 15, 1965. It peaked at number 12 on the Billboard Hot 100 and was the highest charting Beach Boys song to feature Dennis Wilson on lead vocals. According to the contemporary United Press International (UPI) chart published by newspapers across the United States it was number eight in April 1965. It did best in regional playlists in the Twin Cities, Baltimore and San Jose, where it was number two; Dallas, Seattle and San Diego to number three; Portland to number four; and Chicago, Washington DC, Phoenix, Milwaukee, Cincinnati, Hartford, Tulsa and Lincoln, number five. The B-side was "Please Let Me Wonder". The song was also released on the 1965 album The Beach Boys Today!.

Recording
"Do You Wanna Dance?" was recorded on January 11, 1965 at Gold Star Studios and was produced, arranged and conducted by Brian Wilson. Take 3 of the song was used as the master. The song was first released in 1965 in mono on the band's album Today!  with a stereo remix of the song being released in 2012 on the stereo remaster of that same album. It was the Beach Boys' first single to feature session musicians playing most of the backing track while the group overdubbed vocals, an arrangement Wilson would maintain for the next two years.

Reception
Cash Box described it as having "an infectious neo-surfln’ style complete with rapidly-changing, danceable riffs."

Personnel
Sourced from Musician's Union AFM contract sheets and surviving session audio, documented by Craig Slowinski.
The Beach Boys
 Al Jardine – harmony and backing vocals
 Mike Love – harmony and backing vocals
 Brian Wilson – harmony and backing vocals; acoustic grand piano
 Carl Wilson – harmony and backing vocals; electric lead and rhythm guitar
 Dennis Wilson – lead vocals

Additional musicians and production staff

Live version
A live version from March 1965 was released in 2015 for the archival Live in Chicago 1965.

Charts

Bette Midler version

Bette Midler included the song—with the original title restored, "Do You Want to Dance"—on her 1972 debut album The Divine Miss M.  In contrast to the Bobby Freeman, Cliff Richard, and Beach Boys versions, which are uptempo rock and roll songs, Midler slowed the tempo of the song down to a sultry-sounding ballad.  Midler's version was her first single release, reaching #17 on the Billboard Hot 100 chart in early 1973 and the top 10 of the Go-Set National Charts in Australia during April 1973. The song was #76 on Billboard Year-End Hot 100 singles of 1973. 

In 1985, Ula Hedwig, a Bette Midler-soundalike and former backup singer, sang the song emulating Bette Midler's version for a Mercury Sable television commercial after Midler refused to sing in the commercial herself. Midler sued Ford Motor Company in response in the now-memorable case Midler v. Ford Motor Co. in which she argued that utilizing a voice impersonator without her permission constituted appropriation of her personality rights. The Ninth Circuit Court of Appeals ruled in favor of Midler and made Ford pull the advertisement.

Charts

Other versions
The Mamas and the Papas included a version of the song on their debut album If You Can Believe Your Eyes and Ears in 1966.

The Ramones' released a version of "Do You Wanna Dance?" in 1978. It was used in the film Rock 'n' Roll High School, and in a television advertisement for the release of Wall-E on DVD. Record World said that the Ramones' treatment "is brief, rough and to the point."

In popular culture
 The original Bobby Freeman recording features in the comedy-drama film American Graffiti (1973).
 Grateful Dead's Jerry Garcia is rumored to have recorded the guitar on the original Bobby Freeman version. However, there is no definitive documentation of this.
 D-TV set the original Bobby Freeman recording to Flowers and Trees and the Nutcracker Suite segment (Chinese Dance) from Fantasia.

References

1958 singles
1965 singles
1972 debut singles
The Beach Boys songs
Jan and Dean songs
Cliff Richard songs
Del Shannon songs
The Mamas and the Papas songs
We Five songs
Bette Midler songs
Dave Edmunds songs
Ramones songs
Songs about dancing
Song recordings produced by Brian Wilson
Song recordings with Wall of Sound arrangements
Capitol Records singles
Atlantic Records singles
1958 songs
Columbia Graphophone Company singles
Song recordings produced by Norrie Paramor